Azizli may refer to:
 Əzizli, Azerbaijan
 Azizli, Iran